Money printing may refer to: 

 Money creation to increase the money supply
 Debt monetization, financing the government by borrowing from the central bank, in effect creating new money
 Security printing as applied to banknotes ("paper money")
 Quantitative easing, a type of monetary policy meant to lower interest rates
 Modern Monetary Theory, an economic theory that advocates creating new money to fund government purchases